Sweet California is a Spanish girl group formed on 24 January 2013. The group currently consists of Sonia Gómez, Alba Reig and Tamara Nsue; former member Rocío Cabrera departed the group in February 2016, being replaced by Nsue.

They were discovered by record label Warner Music Spain and Must! Producciones and now they have more than 100.000 records sold in Spain, a Best Spanish Act MTV Award, Gold Record and 2× Platinum Records in Spain. They are considered the most important girl group of Spain.

History

2013: Beginnings and Infatuated 
In 2013 they were discovered by the management company responsible for the launch of Auryn, who opted for them and decided to bring the three girls together by taking them to Madrid. The vocalists Rocío Cabrera Torregrosa, Sonia Gómez González and Alba Reig Gilabert began this project, covering viral songs such as "Troublemaker" or "Price Tag" to upload them to YouTube as a presentation. Their great opportunity to present themselves to the public was their performances as opening act on Auryn's "Anti-Heroes" tour.

On July 30, 2013, after having signed a contract with the record company Warner Music Spain that same month, they released their first song: “Infatuated.

2014: Break of Day 
In April 2014, Sweet California released their first album Break of day. Recorded between New York, Los Angeles and Spain, it is Tony Sánchez who is in charge of directing the production. The first single was “This is the Life”, a country-influenced track with a modern dance base, followed by “Comprende (It's over)” or “Indigo”. Break of Day achieves No. 1 in album sales, making Sweet California the only girl band to achieve this popularity, equaled only by the Spice Girls' debut in 1996. Additionally, the album is certified with the Gold Record, and his tour hangs the 'No tickets' sign on most of its dates.

2015: Reissue of Break of Day and Head For The Stars 
In June 2015, coinciding with the beginning of the recording of their second album, Alba, Rocío and Sonia published their first biographical book "El Amanecer de Sweet California". A month later, they present “WonderWoman”, a pop song with urban touches and the collaboration of American hip hop artist Jake Miller. It is the advance of Head for the stars, the new installment of the group that sees the light on September 18 and enters directly at number 1 on the sales list in Spain. Sweet California thus manages to achieve two number 1s in sales in Spain and its two albums in the top 1.

2016–2017: Rocío's departure, Head For The Stars 2.0, 3. 
In February 2016, an official statement announced Rocío's departure:

... life sometimes puts you in difficult situations. Today, one of us decides to take her own path. Rocío has decided to leave the group. The reasons are personal and, although she saddens us, we ask for all your respect and understanding towards the situation.

Shortly after, a new member is added to the group, Tamara Nsue, a friend and dancer of the group for years. A month later, the group reissues their second album with new material. Titled Head for the stars 2.0, the release contains unreleased tracks, re-recordings of the original album with the voice of the new member or acoustic versions. The first single is "Good lovin '2.0", whose video clip exceeds one million views in a few days. On March 18, 2016, the new album by the female trio debuts at No. 1 on the sales chart in Spain, remains in that position for the following weeks and manages to achieve Platinum Record for the more than 40,000 copies sold. In addition, on April 8 they embark on their "Wonder Tour 2.0" that takes Sweet California throughout Spain.

The pop trio released their third studio album in 2016, which they titled 3. Their name, as they explain it, is given because they present the album divided into three thematic sections, the first being the group with "more current" sounds, a second with more retro songs and with more harmonies and a last one with themes in Spanish. Their introduction single is "Good Life", a track with touches of tropical house produced by Tonino Speciale.

After three weeks of its launch, they get the gold record for selling more than 20,000 copies. "3", his new album, came out in December and just over a month has been enough for him to reach the Platinum Record certification, after selling more than 40,000 copies.

In March 2017, they embarked on the Ladies' Tour, their fourth national tour, which once again took them throughout Spain for more than half a year.

On September 1 of the same year, the girlband released the reissue of their third album, which contains unpublished material, DVD images of the most significant concert of their Ladies' Tour, at the Wizink Center in Madrid, and new songs. This reissue will also feature an unreleased song called "¡Ay Dios Mio!", Together with Danny Romero and will feature the collaboration with the Italian duo Benji & Fede in a version of their song "Tutto per una Ragione" entitled "Solo por una Razón".

2018–2019: Origen and Hits Reloaded 
For a few months, Sweet California was between Miami and Lisbon composing their fourth album, recording with very important producers. In turn they continued with their "Ladies Tour" tour throughout the year. In September 2018 they released their first single "Loca", with some "Afro" nuances. "Loca" is a pop song in Spanish, which has more than 10 million views on YouTube, it is composed by Sweet California in Miami, with a positive theme and the freedom to decide and live according to what one believes. " October 6 they exclusively released another song that will be part of their fourth album, "El amor es el amor", a song with a Cuban style made in Miami and composed by the three of them. They wanted to bet on making one more album in their language and that's why they decided to call it Origin, because as Alba said:" it's like going back to our origin, rather to our language. "This new album has songs like" Todo a la vez "," Guay "and has twelve songs. Also in 2019 they begin the Origen Tour, ending it with more than 70 concerts, including their second concert at the emblematic Wizink Center, in November of the same year.

Practically completed the year since the launch of "Origen", on December 6, 2019, sees the light of "HITS RELOADED", Sweet California's latest adventure in which they review the past, present and future of the group.

An album with 23 songs, including 4 unreleased songs, his usual hits and completely re-recorded versions with new productions of some of his most emblematic songs.

2020–currently: Hits Reloaded Tour cancelled, Whisper
The Hits Reloaded Tour was cancelled because of the Covid-19 pandemic. Whisper is scheduled to be released on 3 June 2021.

Members 
 Alba Reig Gilabert (born 5 May 1992, Alicante), 2013–currently
 Sonia Gómez González (born 28 July 1991, Seville), 2013–currently
 Tamara Nsue Sánchez (born 8 July 1993, Madrid), 2016–currently

Former members 
 Rocío Cabrera Torregrosa (born 23 January 1993, Benissa, Alicante), 2013–2016

Discography

Albums
 Break of Day (2014)
 Head for the Stars (2015)
 3 (2016)
 Origen (2018)
 Land of the Free Vol.1 (2022)

Reissues
 Break of Day (Super Deluxe Edition) (2015)
 Head for the Stars (Argentina Edition) (2015)
 Head for the Stars 2.0 (2016)
 Head for the Stars 2.0 (Argentina Edition) (2016)
 3 (Mexico Edition) (2017)
 3 (Ladies' Tour Edition) (2017)

Compilation albums
 Hits Reloaded

Awards and nominations

References

Spanish girl groups
Spanish pop music groups